San Vincenzo may refer to:

Vincenzo, Martyr of Craco, Patron Saint of Craco, Italy
Italian for Saint Vincent

San Vincenzo may also refer to the following places in Italy:

San Vincenzo, Tuscany, in the province of Livorno
San Vincenzo La Costa, in the province of Cosenza
San Vincenzo Valle Roveto, in the province of L'Aquila
San Vincenzo Ferreri, Racconigi, a church and convent in Racconigi, Cuneo, Piedmont, Italy
San Vincenzo, Modena, Catholic church, Corso Canalgrande, Modena, Italy

See also 
Saint Vincent (disambiguation)
 Vincenzo